Ericandersonia is a monospecific genus belonging to the family Zoarcidae, the eelpouts. The only species is Ericandersonia sagamia, a deepwater fish in the family Zoarcidae. The genus and species were newly described in 2006. The genus name honours the South African based American ichthyologist M. Eric Anderson in recognition of his eelpout studies.

References

Gymnelinae
Endemic fauna of Japan
Fish of Japan
Fish described in 2006
Monotypic ray-finned fish genera
Taxobox binomials not recognized by IUCN